Kathryn Smith may refer to:

Kathryn Smith (artist) (born 1975), South African artist
Kathryn Smith (American football) (born 1980s), American football coach
Kathryn Smith (swimmer), English swimmer
Kate Locke (born 1971), author who uses the nom de plume Kathryn Smith among others
Kate Smith (Kathryn Elizabeth Smith, 1907–1986), American singer